Hairspray may refer to:

 Hair spray, a personal grooming product that keeps hair protected from humidity and wind
 Hairspray (1988 film), a film by John Waters
 Hairspray (1988 soundtrack), the film's soundtrack album
 Hairspray (musical), a stage musical based on the original film
 Hairspray (2002 album), the musical's cast album
 Hairspray Live!, a live television musical version of the stage musical
 Hairspray (2007 film), a film based on the musical
 Hairspray (2007 soundtrack), the film's soundtrack album
 Hairspray: The School Musical, a UK reality TV series
 Pucker!, a 1995 album by The Selecter released in the US as Hairspray